The 50th ceremony of the Annie Awards, honoring excellence in the field of animation for the year of 2022, was held on February 25, 2023, at the University of California, Los Angeles's Royce Hall in Los Angeles, California in live ceremony after two years as virtual event.

The nominees were announced on January 17, 2023, Guillermo del Toro's Pinocchio led the nominations with nine, followed by Turning Red with seven.

Winners and nominees

Productions Categories

Individual achievement categories

Juried awards

June Foray Award

 Mindy Johnson

The Certificate of Merit Award

 John Omohundro

Ub Iwerks Award

 Visual Effects Reference Platform

Winsor McCay Lifetime Achievement Awards
Pete Docter
Evelyn Lambart (posthumously)
Craig McCracken

Multiple awards and nominations

Films

The following films received multiple nominations:

The following films received multiple awards:

Television/Broadcast

The following shows received multiple nominations:

The following shows received multiple awards:

References

External links
 Official website
 Complete list of 50th Annual Annie Awards nominees

2022
Annie
Annie
Annie